The Clarks Fork of the Yellowstone River (sometimes called the Clark's Fork River) is a tributary of the Yellowstone River, 150 mi (241 km) long in the U.S. states of Montana and Wyoming.

It rises in southern Montana, in the Gallatin National Forest in the Beartooth Mountains, approximately 4 mi (6 km) northeast of Cooke City and southwest of Granite Peak. It flows southeast into the Shoshone National Forest in northwest Wyoming, east of Yellowstone National Park, then northeast back into Montana. It passes Belfry, Bridger, Fromberg, and Edgar, and joins the Yellowstone approximately 2 mi (3 km) southeast of Laurel.

The Clarks Fork of the Yellowstone River should not be confused with the Clark Fork River, which is located in Montana and Idaho.

See also

Montana Stream Access Law
List of rivers of Montana
List of Wyoming rivers

References

Rivers of Montana
Rivers of Wyoming
Rivers of Park County, Montana
Rivers of Carbon County, Montana
Tributaries of the Yellowstone River
Wild and Scenic Rivers of the United States